This is a list of notable honorary degree recipients from Hofstra University in New York.

Key

1940s

1950s

1960s

1970s

1980s

1990s

2000s

2010s

2020s

Notes

References
Honorary degree recipients - official website of Hofstra University

 
Hofstra
Hofstra